Ma Long or Malong may refer to:

People 
Ma Long (Jin dynasty) (fl. 251–290; 马隆/馬隆/Mǎ Lóng), Cao Wei and Jin dynasty (266–420) military general.
Ma-long (馬龍/马龙/mǎlóng/maa5 lung4), Hong Kong political cartoonist.

 Ma Long (born 1988; 马龙/馬龍/Mǎ Lóng), Chinese table tennis player.

Ma Long (footballer) (born 1990; 马龙/馬龍/Mǎ Lóng), Chinese football player

Other 
 Malong County (马龙县/Mǎlóng Xiàn), in Qujing Prefecture, Yunnan, China.
 Malong, the tube skirt from Southeast Asia
 Malong, Meichuan, a village in Meichuan, Wuxue, Huanggang, Hubei
 Malong Revolt (1660–1661), see Philippine revolts against Spain#Malong Revolt (1660–1661)

See also 
 Longma (龙马/龍馬/lóngmǎ/lung-ma), the dragon horse of Chinese mythology